Alain Lamassoure (born 10 February 1944 in Pau) is a French politician and Member of the European Parliament for the south-west of France. He was a member of Les Républicains, which is part of the European People's Party, and was the chairman of the European Parliament's Committee on Budgets from July 2009 until June 2014.

He is a substitute for the Committee on Constitutional Affairs, a member of the delegation for relations with the countries of South Asia and the South Asian Association for Regional Cooperation, and a member of the EPP-ED bureau. He was also a member of the temporary committee on policy challenges and budgetary means of the enlarged Union 2007–2013. Lamassoure is a member of the Reconciliation of European Histories Group.

He was in charge of writing parts of the Treaty of Lisbon. Alain Lamassoure is a well-known pro-European. He is a member of the European Movement France, which he has been vice-president of, and has a privileged relationship with the diverse European federalist groups.

Career
 Graduate of the Paris Institute of Political Studies (1964) and ENA (National School of Administration) (1968)
 Auditor, Commissioner of Audit, then Senior Member of the Court of Auditors (1968–1973, 1976–1977, 1981–1986, 1997–1999)
 Special adviser in the office of the Minister for Cultural Affairs (1973–1974)
 Technical adviser in the offices of the Minister for Finance (1974–1976), the Minister for Infrastructure (1977–1978) and the President of the Republic (1978–1981)
 Economic and social adviser (1985–1986)
 Delegate, 'Perspectives et Réalités' clubs (1985–1989)
 UDF spokesman (1988)
 Vice-President of the UDF (1999–2002)
 National Secretary of the UMP (since July 2003)
 First Deputy Mayor of Anglet (1995–1999)
 Mayor of Anglet (1999–2000)
 Member of the Anglet Municipal Council (since 2000)
 Chairman of the Bayonne-Anglet-Biarritz Urban Area Community Council (1995–2001)
 Vice-Chairman of the Bayonne-Anglet-Biarritz Urban Area Community Council (since 2001)
 Chairman of the Council of Elected Representatives of the Basque Country
 Member of the National Assembly (1986–1993)
 Minister with special responsibility for European Affairs (1993–1995)
 Minister with special responsibility for the budget and government spokesman (1995–1997)
 Member of the European Parliament (1989–1993 and since 1999)
 Chairman of the Committee on Budgetary Control (1992–1993)
 Representative of the European Parliament at the European Convention (2002–2003)
 Vice-President of the European Movement – France (since 1999)
 Chairman of the Committee on Budgets (2009–2014)
 Knight of the Legion of Honour

References

External links

 Official website (in French)
 European Parliament biography
 Declaration of financial interests (in French)

1944 births
École nationale d'administration alumni
French Ministers of Budget
Government spokespersons of France
Living people
MEPs for France 1989–1994
MEPs for France 1999–2004
MEPs for South-West France 2004–2009
MEPs for South-West France 2009–2014
MEPs for Île-de-France 2014–2019
People from Pau, Pyrénées-Atlantiques
The Republicans (France) MEPs
Union for a Popular Movement MEPs